Neuville-aux-Bois is a commune in the Loiret department in north-central France.

Notable people
 Damien Plessis, footballer

See also
 Communes of the Loiret department

References

Neuvilleauxbois